The visvedevas refers to the designation used to address the entirety of the various deities featured in the Vedas. It also refers to a specific classification of deities in the Puranas. The visvedevas are sometimes regarded as the most comprehensive gathering of the gods, a classification in which no deity is stated to be omitted.

Literature

Rigveda 
In the Rigveda a number of hymns are addressed  to these deities, including (according to Griffith): 1.3,1.89,3.54-56, 4.55, 5.41-51, 6.49-52, 7.34-37, 39, 40, 42, 43, 8.27-30, 58, 83 10.31, 35, 36, 56, 57, 61-66, 92, 93, 100, 101, 109, 114, 126, 128, 137, 141, 157, 165, 181.

RV 3.54.17 addresses them as headed by Indra:
This is, ye Wise, your great and glorious title, that all ye Deities abide in Indra. (trans. Griffith)

The dichotomy between devas is not evident in these hymns, and the devas are invoked together such as Mitra and Varuna. Though many devas are named in the Rigveda, only 33 devas are counted, eleven of them present each in earth, space, and heaven.

Manusmriti 
According to Manu (iii, 90, 121), offerings should be made daily to the visvedevas.  These privileges were bestowed on them by Brahma and the Pitri as a reward for severe austerities they had performed on the Himalayas.

Puranas 
In later Hinduism, the visvedevas form one of the nine ganadevatas (along with the adityas, vasus, tushitas, abhasvaras, anilas, maharajikas, sadhyas, and rudras). According to the Vishnu Purana and Padma Purana, they were the sons of Vishvā, a daughter of Daksha, described as follows: 

 Vasu 
 Satya 
 Kratu 
 Daksha 
 Kala 
 Kama 
 Dhrti 
 Kuru 
 Pururavas 
 Madravas 
 Rocaka or Locana
 Dhvani or Dhuri

Mahabharata 
The visvedevas are described to have incarnated on earth due to the curse of sage Vishvamitra, as the five sons of Draupadi with the Pandavas - the Upapandavas. They are described to have returned to their original forms after being killed by Ashvatthama at night.

See also
Adityas
Vasus
Rudras
Rigvedic deities

References

Rigvedic deities

Hindu deities